Belding is a surname. Notable people with the surname include:

Elizabeth Belding, American engineer
John Belding (1650–1713), American settler
Lester Belding (1900–1965), American athlete and coach
Lyman Belding (1829–1917), American ornithologist